The Development Experience Clearinghouse (DEC) is the U.S. Agency for International Development (USAID) online repository for materials documenting its nearly half century offering international humanitarian aid and economic, agricultural, trade, health, and democratic support.

Established in 1975, the DEC now holds over 168,000 documents, with over 157,000 of them available electronically. The collection includes oral histories of retired USAID staff, program planning documents from USAID, as well as descriptions of past projects that USAID has sponsored. DEC also produces the DEC Express, a biweekly electronic publication.

DEC has offices in the Ronald Reagan Building and International Trade Center in Washington, D.C.

References

External links
Official website

United States Agency for International Development
Government agencies established in 1975